John Troyer (born August 13, 1985) is an MMA fighter.

Bellator Fighting Championships
Troyer fought three times in the Bellator Fighting Championships.  He lost to Justin Edwards at Bellator 5, lost to Brent Weedman at Bellator 23 and defeated Josh Clark at Bellator 30.

Other promotions
Troyer previously fought for Super Fight League and XFC.

References

Living people
1985 births
American male mixed martial artists